The Boss is a 1968 live album by American jazz organist Jimmy Smith.

Reception
The Allmusic review by Roy Wynn awarded the album three stars and said:

Track listing
 "The Boss" (Jimmy Smith) – 7:55
 "This Guy's in Love With You" (Burt Bacharach, Hal David) – 8:48
 "Some of My Best Friends Are Blues" (Smith) – 5:52
 "Fingers" (Smith) – 10:30
 "Tuxedo Junction" (Buddy Feyne, Erskine Hawkins, Bill Johnson, Julian Dash) – 9:29

Recorded at Paschal's La Carousel, Atlanta, Georgia

Personnel

Musicians
 Jimmy Smith – organ
 George Benson – guitar
 Nathen Page – guitar (track 4)
 Donald Bailey – drums

Technical
 Esmond Edwards – producer
 Val Valentin – director of engineering
 Mike Mendel  – cover design
 Sid Maurer – art direction

References

Verve Records live albums
Jimmy Smith (musician) live albums
1968 live albums